Brian Dowd (born August 27, 1965) is a Canadian former professional ice hockey defenseman who was an All-American for Northeastern.

Career
Dowd began attending Northeastern University in 1984. His first two seasons with the ice hockey team were unspectacular but he did show some improvement. Dowd came into his own beginning in his junior season, tripling his point production. He continued his elevated play as a senior and was named an All-American. He helped the Huskies finish second in Hockey East and win the conference tournament. Northeastern made just its second tournament appearance, however, the team suffered an ignominious fate by being the only team in history to lose to a Division III program in history. Despite the less than happy ending to his college career, Dowd was selected by the Edmonton Oilers in the Supplemental Draft and signed a professional contract. He spent the next season with the Fort Wayne Komets, playing well. Dowd was second in scoring from the blueline but decided to retire after the year.

Dowd later moved to the Buffalo area and became a distributor for DePuy. He continued to work in sales and became an executive for Hologic in 2010, a position he holds as of 2021.

Statistics

Regular season and playoffs

Awards and honors

References

External links

1965 births
Living people
AHCA Division I men's ice hockey All-Americans
Canadian ice hockey defencemen
Edmonton Oilers draft picks
Fort Wayne Komets players
Ice hockey people from Ontario
National Hockey League supplemental draft picks
Northeastern Huskies men's ice hockey players
Sportspeople from Hamilton, Ontario